Lukashin is a neighbourhood in  Yerevan, the capital of Armenia. 

It was named after Sargis Lukashin (1883-1937), president of the Armenian Council of People's Commissars.

References
 

Populated places in Yerevan